This is a list of places in South Africa which have standing links to local communities in other countries. In most cases, the association, especially when formalised by local government, is known as "town twinning" (usually in Europe) or "sister cities" (usually in the rest of the world).

B
Bergrivier
 Heist-op-den-Berg, Belgium

Bloemfontein

 Bhubaneswar, India
 Nanjing, China

Buffalo City

 Jinhua, China
 Leiden, Netherlands
 Milwaukee County, United States
 Oldenburg, Germany
 Qinhuangdao, China

C
Cape Town

 Aachen, Germany
 Accra, Ghana
 Antwerp, Belgium 
 Bujumbura, Burundi
 Dubai, United Arab Emirates
 Funchal, Portugal
 Haifa, Israel
 Hangzhou, China
 Maputo, Mozambique
 Malmö, Sweden
 Miami-Dade County, United States
 Monterrey, Mexico
 Rio de Janeiro, Brazil
 Saint Petersburg, Russia
 Varna, Bulgaria

D
Dordrecht
 Dordrecht, Netherlands

Drakenstein
 Walvis Bay, Namibia

Durban

 Alexandria, Egypt
 Bremen, Germany
 Bulawayo, Zimbabwe
 Chicago, United States
 Daejeon, South Korea
 Guangzhou, China
 Kaohsiung, Taiwan
 Leeds, England, United Kingdom
 Libreville, Gabon
 Maputo, Mozambique
 Mersin, Turkey
 Mombasa, Kenya
 New Orleans, United States
 Oran, Algeria
 Le Port, Réunion, France

E
East London
 Daqing, China

Ekurhuleni
 Harbin, China

F
Franschhoek
 Dilbeek, Belgium

G
George

 Saint Paul, United States
 Tacoma, United States

I
iLembe

 Mobile, United States
 Zhanjiang, China

J
Johannesburg

 Addis Ababa, Ethiopia
 Birmingham, England, United Kingdom
 Ho Chi Minh City, Vietnam

 New York City, United States
 Ramallah, Palestine
 Taipei, Taiwan
 Verona, Italy
 Windhoek, Namibia

K
King Cetshwayo
 Milwaukee, United States

M
Mathopestad
 Berkeley, United States

Mbombela

 Baotou, China
 Maia, Portugal
 Mbabane, Eswatini

Mogale
 Wujiang (Suzhou), China

Mossel Bay
 Denpasar, Indonesia

Msunduzi

 Hampton, United States
 Taichung, Taiwan

N
Nelson Mandela Bay

 Gothenburg, Sweden
 Jacksonville, United States
 Ningbo, China
 Tainan, Taiwan 

Newcastle

 Nanchang, China
 Zibo, China

O
Oudtshoorn

 Alphen aan den Rijn, Netherlands
 Hualien, Taiwan

Oukasie
 Berkeley, United States

P
Polokwane
 Reggio Emilia, Italy

Pretoria

 Baku, Azerbaijan
 Bucharest, Romania
 Bulawayo, Zimbabwe
 Hanoi, Vietnam
 Kyiv, Ukraine
 Port Louis, Mauritius
 Taipei, Taiwan
 Tehran, Iran
 Washington, D.C., United States

R
Ray Nkonyeni
 Oskarshamn, Sweden

S
Sol Plaatje
 Changsha, China

Stellenbosch
 Paju, South Korea

U
Upington
 Temora, Australia

W
Witzenberg

 Bozhou, China
 Essen, Belgium

Worcester
 Aalst, Belgium

References

South Africa
Cities in South Africa
Foreign relations of South Africa
South Africa geography-related lists
Populated places in South Africa